The Kazakhstan Handball Federation (KHF) is the administrative and controlling body for handball and beach handball in Republic of Kazakhstan. KHF is a member of the Asian Handball Federation (AHF) and member of the International Handball Federation (IHF) since 1992.

National teams
 Kazakhstan men's national handball team
 Kazakhstan men's national junior handball team
 Kazakhstan women's national handball team

Competitions hosted
 2021 Asian Women's Youth Handball Championship
 2020 Asian Women's Club League Handball Championship
 2020 Asian Men's Youth Handball Championship 
 2019 Asian Women's Club League Handball Championship
 2018 Asian Women's Club League Handball Championship
 2016 Asian Women's Club League Handball Championship
 2015 Asian Women's Junior Handball Championship
 2013 Asian Women's Junior Handball Championship
 2011 Asian Women's Junior Handball Championship
 2010 Asian Women's Handball Championship
 2007 Asian Women's Junior Handball Championship
 2002 Asian Women's Handball Championship

References

Notes

External links
 Kazakhstan at the IHF website.
 Kazakhstan at the AHF website.

Sports organizations established in 1957
1957 establishments in the Kazakh Soviet Socialist Republic
Handball governing bodies
Handball in Kazakhstan
Sports governing bodies in Kazakhstan
Asian Handball Federation
National members of the International Handball Federation